Shippo may refer to:
Shippo (company), American e-commerce software company
Shippō, Aichi, former Japanese town merged into the city of Ama in 2010
Shippō Station, Nagoya Railroad Co. station in Ama, Aichi
Shippo (ikebana), a tool used in ikebana (Japanese flower arrangement), for example in moribana
Shippo, a character in Inuyasha

See also